The Californians is a 2005 American independent drama film from Hart Sharp Films starring Noah Wyle. It is a modern-day adaptation of the 1886 Henry James novel The Bostonians, with the location moved from Boston to Marin County, California, and with the political topic driving the plot changed from feminism to environmentalism. The Californians is the second film adaptation of The Bostonians, after the 1984 film The Bostonians.

Plot

Gavin Ransom (Noah Wyle) is a successful real estate developer who has made a tidy fortune putting up gated communities filled with expensive suburban homes all over California. Ransom intends to put up another such development in the as-yet-untouched hillsides of Northern California's Marin County, and, just as he's expected, a number of folks living nearby are objecting to the project, including his sister Olive (Illeana Douglas), an environmental activist who has sided with longtime resident Eileen Boatwright (Cloris Leachman) and progressive lawyer Sybil (Jane Lynch) against the development. Olive and her compatriots get some unexpected support when Zoe Tripp (Kate Mara), a modern folk singer and the daughter of old-school Marin County hippies (Keith Carradine and Valerie Perrine), takes an interest in their protests and begins singing out against Gavin's proposal with guitar in hand. Gavin unexpectedly finds himself growing powerfully infatuated with Zoe, and Olive, a long-closeted lesbian, is equally taken with her; consequently, as the siblings battle against building several dozen cookie-cutter mansions, they also wage a private war for the affections of the young songstress.

Cast
 Noah Wyle as Gavin Ransom
 Illeana Douglas as Olive Ransom
 Kate Mara as Zoe Tripp
 Cloris Leachman as Eileen Boatwright
 Joanne Whalley as Luna
 Keith Carradine as Elton Tripp
 Valerie Perrine as Lenora Tripp
 Jane Lynch as Sybill Platt
 Michael Panes as Marion Pardon
 Terry McGovern as Mr. Putterman
 Erika Luckett as Mary Ann
 Will Marchetti as Mayor
 Carl Bressler as Martin Berg
 Richard Gross as Contractor
 Kurtis Bedford as Reporter
 Charles Martinet as City Councilman

References

External links
 Official site
 
 

2005 films
American independent films
2005 drama films
American drama films
2005 independent films
2000s English-language films
2000s American films